The Pampas are fertile South America lowlands.

Pampa or La Pampa may also refer to:

Places

South America
La Pampa Province, Argentina
La Pampa, Córdoba, Argentina
La Pampa District, Peru
La Pampa, Peru
Pampa del Tamarugal, Chile

Elsewhere
 Pamba River, also Pampa River, in Kerala, India
 Pampa Sarovar, a lake near Hampi, India
 Bena, California, formerly Pampa, U.S.
 Pampa, Texas, U.S.

People 
 Adikavi Pampa (902–975), 10th-century Kannada language poet

Other uses
 FMA IA-63 Pampa, a jet training aircraft
 Pampa Energía, Argentine energy company
 Ford Pampa, a coupe utility manufactured by Ford do Brasil
 Pampa (bird), a genus of hummingbird
 Pampa sheep, a sheep breed
 Parallel artificial membrane permeability assay (PAMPA), in medicinal chemistry
 Puelche language or Pampa language

See also
 Pampas (disambiguation)
 La Pampa (disambiguation)
 Pampers, a brand of baby and toddler products